Gravitational Pull vs. the Desire for an Aquatic Life is the second studio album by ambient drone music group Stars of the Lid. It was recorded on four track and released as an LP on Sedimental in 1996. The album features short, medium and long minimal, droning compositions created from heavily treated guitar, horn, piano and other classical instruments.

Critical reaction
The album received moderate praise from critics.  Nitsuh Abebe, writing for Allmusic, stated:

Release history
Following the vinyl issue from Sedimental in 1996, the album was released on CD in October 1997 on Kranky, and this reissue contained the extra track "Jan. 69". The band was displeased with the Sedimental pressing and therefore delighted when Kranky released it on CD. They wrote,

Track listing

LP

Side A
"The Better Angels of Our Nation"
"Cantus II; In Memory of Warren Wiltzie"

Side B
"Lactate's Moment"
"Be Little with Me"

CD
"The Better Angels of Our Nation" – 3:56
"Cantus II; In Memory of Warren Wiltzie" – 19:03
"Jan. 69" – 9:24
"Lactate's Moment" – 12:18
"Be Little with Me" – 6:27

References

1997 albums
Stars of the Lid albums
Kranky albums
Post-rock albums by American artists
Albums produced by Adam Wiltzie